The Leica Vario-Elmarit-SL 24-90mm F2.8-4 ASPH is an interchangeable standard zoom lens for Leica L mount, announced by Leica on October 20, 2015.

A review in PCMag UK praised the lens for its sharpness, low distortion and weatherproof, optically stabilised design, while also drawing attention to its vignetting of up to 5.5 stops at 24mm.

References

Camera lenses introduced in 2015
Leica L-mount lenses